The Florence Unified School District is a school district serving grades K-12 in Florence and San Tan Valley, Arizona.

Elementary schools
Florence USD elementary schools serve grades K-8.

Anthem K-8
Circle Cross Ranch K-8 S.T.E.M. Academy
Copper Basin K-8
Florence K-8
Magma Ranch K-8
San Tan Heights K-8
Skyline Ranch K-8
Walker Butte K-8 Leadership School

High schools
The district operates three high schools: Florence High School, San Tan Foothills High School, and Poston Butte High School.

Alternative Schools
The district also operates one Alternative School, Mountain Vista Academy, that includes online courses for credit recovery and programs for students with disabilities.

References

External links
 

School districts in Pinal County, Arizona